G1/S-specific cyclin-D3 is a protein that in humans is encoded by the CCND3 gene.

Function 

The protein encoded by this gene belongs to the highly conserved cyclin family, whose members are characterized by a dramatic periodicity in protein abundance through the cell cycle. Cyclins function as regulators of CDK kinases. Different cyclins exhibit distinct expression and degradation patterns which contribute to the temporal coordination of each mitotic event. This cyclin forms a complex with and functions as a regulatory subunit of CDK4 or CDK6, whose activity is required for cell cycle G1/S transition. This protein has been shown to interact with and be involved in the phosphorylation of tumor suppressor protein Rb. The CDK4 activity associated with this cyclin was reported to be necessary for cell cycle progression through G2 phase into mitosis after UV radiation.

Clinical significance 

Mutations in CCND3 are implicated in cases of breast cancer.

Interactions 

Cyclin D3 has been shown to interact with:

 AKAP8, 
 CDC2L1, 
 CDKN1B,
 CRABP2, 
 Cyclin-dependent kinase 4, 
 Cyclin-dependent kinase 6, 
 EIF3K, and
 Retinoic acid receptor alpha.

See also 
 Cyclin
 Cyclin D

References

Further reading 

 
 
 
 
 
 
 
 
 
 
 
 
 
 
 
 
 
 
 

Cell cycle regulators